Buena Television (also known as Buena TV) is a Venezuelan regional television station that can be seen by those who live in the Tachira State.

History
Buena TV was inaugurated on August 1, 2006, by its founder, the then governor of the Tachira State Ronald Blanco La Cruz.

References

Television networks in Venezuela
Television stations in Venezuela
Bolivarian Communication and Information System
Commercial-free television networks
Television channels and stations established in 2006